The Mexican state of Veracruz has the most radio stations of any of the 32 states, with 107 FM stations and AM-FM combos, plus two unique AM stations, as of March 2016.

Veracruz-Xalapa

FM stations

AM stations

Poza Rica-Tuxpan-Papantla

FM stations

AM stations

Cordoba-Orizaba-Fortin de Las Flores

FM stations

AM stations

Coatzacoalcos-Minatitlán-Cosoleacaque

FM stations

AM stations

Cuenca del Papaloapan-Los Tuxtlas-Acayucan

FM stations

AM stations

Misantla, San Rafael, Martinez de la Torre

FM stations

Northern Veracruz, Huasteca Alta

FM stations

References

Veracruz